Angelina Banytė  (born 1949) is a Lithuanian painter.

She graduated from the Lithuanian Institute of Art in 1974. 
Since 1978, she has been a member of Lithuanian artists' association.
Her work appears at the Clock Museum.
Since 1976, she has lived in Klaipėda.

Works
 Dainavos šalis – "Dainavos" sanatorija, Druskininkai, 1974 m.
 Jūros dugnas – "Gintaro" poilsio namai, Palanga, 1976 m.
 Medicina – Klaipėdos ligoninė, 1976 m.
 Gamtos dovanos – "Pušyno" poilsio namai, Palanga 1978 m.
 Mūsų kraštas – su Natalija Daškova ir Sofija Veiveryte, Agrarinės ekonomikos institutas, Vilnius, 1980 m.
 Paukščiai – Klaipėdos gimdymo namai, 1981 m.
 Laikas ir Klaipėda – su Juozu Vosyliumi, Klaipėdos laikrodžių muziejus, 1996 m.
 Dievas Tėvas – Klaipėdos Marijos Taikos Karalienės bažnyčia, 1996 m.

See also
List of Lithuanian painters

References

1949 births
Living people
Lithuanian painters
People from Mažeikiai
20th-century Lithuanian women artists
21st-century Lithuanian women artists